Bollington Methodist Church is located in Wellington Road, Bollington, Cheshire, England.  The church is recorded in the National Heritage List for England as a designated Grade II listed building.

History
The church was built in 1886, and designed by the Manchester architect William Waddington.  Internal alterations were carried out in 1959.

In 2012 worship ceased, and the building was sold. In 2016 the lower floor was converted into a childcare centre.

Architecture
Constructed in buff ashlar sandstone, the church has a Welsh slate roof with a tiled ridge.  Its architectural style is that of the 13th century.  It consists of a five-bay nave with a southwest steeple, and is aligned almost north-south.  The entrance front, on the south, has four steps leading to twin-lancet doorways.  Over these is a four-light window containing Geometric tracery, flanked by lancet windows.  The hexagonal tower is in four stages with louvred bell openings in the top stage.  It is surmounted by a broach spire.  Along the sides of the church are mullioned and transomed lancet windows.  Inside the church is a south gallery.  Some of the windows contain stained glass.

See also

Listed buildings in Bollington

References

Further reading

Methodist
Former Methodist churches in the United Kingdom
Former churches in Cheshire
Grade II listed churches in Cheshire
Churches completed in 1886
Gothic Revival church buildings in England
Gothic Revival architecture in Cheshire